Eric Coleman may refer to:
Eric D. Coleman (born 1951), Democratic Party politician in the United States
Eric Coleman (defensive back) (born 1966), American football player 
Eric Coleman (producer) (born 1968), American television producer
Eric Coleman (doctor) (born 1965), American geriatrician and academic

See also
Erik Coleman (born 1982), American football safety